Road to India may refer to:
Road to India (video game), an adventure video game released in 2001
"Road to India" (Family Guy), 2016 television episode